A periphery, (Fr: couronne) is an INSEE (French demographic statistics institution) statistical area designating a commuter belt around an urban unit (Fr: unité urbaine). Together these complete the INSEE urban area statistical area.

Based on France's commune system (interlocking administrative subdivisions often comparable to civil parishes, towns or cities), a commune is considered part of a couronne when
 it is not densely constructed enough or is too isolated to be part of any unité urbaine (or "pôle urbain" if it is the core of the agglomeration), and
 at least 40% of its population commutes to workplaces in a unité urbaine or pôle urbain, or to another commune connected to a unité urbaine through the same criteria.

References

Demographics of France
Subdivisions of France
INSEE concepts